KC Cariappa may refer to:

 Air Marshal K C Cariappa, a Squadron Leader during the 1965 Indo-Pakistan War.
 KC Cariappa (cricketer), Indian cricketer who plays for Kings XI Punjab.